Kamran Khan Show may refer to:

 Aaj Kamran Khan Kay Sath, the news show broadcast by Geo News formerly known as Kamran Khan Show
 Aaj Shahzeb Khanzada Kay Sath, the news show that replaced Aaj Kamran Khan Kay Sath
 Dunya Kamran Khan Kay Sath, the news show broadcast by Dunya News.